Mission Creek is a stream in the U.S. state of South Dakota.

Mission Creek was named for a Christian mission along its course.

See also
List of rivers of South Dakota

References

Rivers of Stanley County, South Dakota
Rivers of South Dakota